The Chief Rabbinate of Israel (Ha-Rabbanut Ha-Rashit Li-Yisra'el) is recognized by law as the supreme rabbinic authority for Judaism in Israel. The Chief Rabbinate Council assists the two Chief Rabbis, who alternate in its presidency. It has legal and administrative authority to organize religious arrangements for Israel's Jews. It also responds to halakhic questions submitted by Jewish public bodies in the Diaspora. The Council sets, guides, and supervises agencies within its authority.

The Chief Rabbinate of Israel consists of two Chief Rabbis: an Ashkenazi rabbi, and a Sephardi rabbi; the latter also is known as the Rishon leZion. The Chief Rabbis are elected for 10-year terms. The present Sephardi Chief Rabbi is Yitzhak Yosef, and the Ashkenazi Chief Rabbi is David Lau, both of whom began their terms in 2013.

The Rabbinate has jurisdiction over many aspects of Jewish life in Israel. Its jurisdiction includes personal status issues, such as Jewish marriages and Jewish divorce, as well as Jewish burials, conversion to Judaism, kosher laws and kosher certification, Jewish immigrants to Israel (olim), supervision of Jewish holy sites, working with various ritual baths (mikvaot) and yeshivas, and overseeing Rabbinical courts in Israel.

The Rabbinical courts are part of Israel's judicial system, and are managed by the Ministry of Religious Services. The courts have exclusive jurisdiction over marriage and divorce of Jews, and have parallel competence with district courts in matters of personal status, alimony, child support, custody, and inheritance. Religious court verdicts are implemented and enforced — as for the civil court system — by the police, bailiff's office, and other agencies.

The Chief Rabbinate headquarters are located at Beit Yahav building, 80 Yirmiyahu Street, Jerusalem. The former seat of the institution, the Heichal Shlomo building, has been serving since 1992 mainly as a museum.

History
All religious and personal status matters in Israel are determined by the religious authorities of the recognised confessional communities to which a person belongs. There are Jewish, Muslim, and Druze communities, and ten officially recognised Christian communities. This organisation is based on the Millet system employed in the Ottoman Empire.

At the beginning of the 17th century, the title of Rishon LeZion was given to the Chief Rabbi of Jerusalem. In 1842, the position of "Hakham Bashi", Chief Rabbi of Constantinople who represented the Turkish Jews before the Sultan, and the position of Rishon LeZion, which at that time already represented the Old Yishuv before the Sultan, were combined into one position, called Rishon LeZion.

During the period of the British Mandate of Palestine, the High Commissioner established the Orthodox Rabbinate, comprising the Rishon LeZion to which was added an Ashkenazi Chief Rabbi, which it recognised collectively as the religious authority for the Jewish community. In 1921, Abraham Isaac Kook became the Ashkenazi Chief Rabbi, and Jacob Meir became the Sephardi Chief Rabbi.

In 1947, David Ben-Gurion and the Orthodox-religious parties reached an agreement, which included an understanding that matters of personal status in Israel would continue to be determined by the existing religious authorities. This arrangement has been termed the status quo agreement, and has been maintained despite numerous changes of government since.

Under the arrangement, the Mandate period confessional system would continue, with membership in the Jewish community being on the basis of membership of a body called "Knesset Israel", which was a voluntary organization open to Jews. There does not seem to have been any dispute at the time of who was a Jew. Jews could choose not to register with "Knesset Israel". Members of Agudath Israel, for example, chose not to register.

In 1953, rabbinical courts were established, with jurisdiction over matters of marriage and divorces of all Jews in Israel, nationals and residents (section 1). It was also provided that marriages and divorces of Jews in Israel would be conducted according to the law of the Torah (section 2).

Since 1953, the rabbinate has only approved religious marriages in Israel conducted in accordance with the Orthodox interpretation of halakha. The only exception to these arrangements was that marriages entered into abroad would be recognised in Israel as valid.

Conversions 
The Chief Rabbinate is recognised by the State of Israel as the sole authority to perform conversions to Judaism in Israel. This was often done sensitively, and with an appreciation for halachic traditions; for example, with Ben-Zion Uziel, who was very encouraging of converts. In recent generations, the interpretation of the process has become more stringent, to the extent that it takes actions that are unprecedented in Jewish history, such as cancelling conversions. Some rabbis claim this centralisation is a threat to the future of the Jewish people.

There has been significant controversy surrounding the relationship of the Chief Rabbis and the conversion process. It was revealed that they held a list of Beth Dins whose conversions it will recognise, and maintained a secret blacklist of rabbis whose conversions they would not recognise. This list caused controversy, since there were a number of well-regarded Orthodox rabbis on the list, including Avi Weiss and Yehoshua Fass. The list also included some Conservative and Reform conversion programs, which the Chief Rabbis do not accept ideologically, but left many off the list. These lists were kept secret, offering no opportunity for outside review or appeal, and led to some confusion.

The blacklist did not affect anyone's ability to make aliya, since that is controlled by the Law of Return, and not through the Rabbinate, but it did impact on people's ability to get married in Israel.

The situation became even more difficult when it was revealed that Haskel Lookstein, an Orthodox rabbi in the United States, was included on the blacklist, and some of his students were not permitted to marry in Israel. Lookstein was the officiating rabbi at Ivanka Trump's conversion and created some difficulties between Israel and the United States, since this was revealed shortly after the election of her father to the presidency. Soon after that, the rules were amended so that Trump's conversion was accepted, although there were some questions about whether that was done merely to curry favour with the new US president.

The conversion process was dragged into the political sphere when the ultra-Orthodox allies of the Chief Rabbis in the Knesset attempted to pass a law stating that the Chief Rabbinate would be the only body authorized by the government to perform recognised conversions in Israel.

The control that the Rabbinate attempted to exert extended beyond the Israeli borders when they attempted to create universal standards for conversion for all Jewish communities outside of Israel.

The Chief Rabbis have faced push back against their stance in Israel, through the rabbis of Tzohar, who have created an independent path to conversion, and are trying to alleviate some of the "horror stories" that come from the Rabbinate. Tzohar have claimed to have performed over 500 conversions of children by 2018. They are also simplifying the process for surrogates to convert. The Supreme Court has since demanded that their conversions be accepted, although there are efforts to legislate to override the High Court's decision.

There are also other efforts within the Orthodox world to conduct conversions outside of the Rabbinate. These includes efforts by Haim Amsalem and Chuck Davidson, who want to return to the traditions of the earlier Chief Rabbis such as Ben-Zion Uziel, with a more lenient approach in keeping with the Halacha. Part of this desire is to deal with the over 300,000 Israelis from the former Soviet Union who are not recognised by the Rabbinate as Jewish, and the increasing problem of assimilation and intermarriage outside of Israel.

The conversion debate today surrounds the Orthodox stream. There is pressure from within the Reform and Conservative communities to have their conversions recognized.

In March 2019, it was confirmed that the Chief Rabbinate were using DNA testing to determine Jewish status. A consensus among religious Zionist and Modern Orthodox organizations were outraged, as this is contrary to Jewish law. Rabbi Aaron Leibowitz, the CEO of Chuppot and Hashgacha Pratit, called the Chief Rabbinate "racist".

Marriages 

Only religious marriage is recognized in Israel; as such, the Chief Rabbinate is granted control over all Jewish marriages. They also have the right to refuse someone the status of Jew, thus making it impossible for them to get legally married in Israel. The Rabbinate and their local religious councils are the only ones able to register rabbis to perform weddings, thus creating a monopoly for themselves.

The Rabbinate control also means that there are 400,000 Russians who have moved to Israel, many who are Jewish, who are not permitted to marry in Israel, forcing them to travel overseas to marry.

However, Israel does have a legal framework for civil unions, which has the same legal standing as marriage; therefore, someone who does marry outside of the Rabbinate can have their union recognized by the state. This same mechanism has been used for same-sex unions, even though there is no legal same-sex marriage in Israel.

Because of Israeli law, the rabbi that performs a marriage outside of the Rabbinate can be charged with a criminal offense and be jailed for up to two years. In spite of this, there are a number of people and organizations that perform marriages outside of the rabbinate framework. Chuck Davidson has openly challenged the state to jail him for his performing of marriages. He has personally performed hundreds of marriages outside of the rabbinate, while those in his network have performed many more. He works with Hashgacha Pratit, another organization which challenges the monopoly of the Rabbinate on kashrut and weddings.

Seth Farber has set up an organization, Itim. While Itim still works from within the Rabbinate, and, therefore, is beholden to their rules, it tries to find a gentler path for the many secular people who want to use their services. Another group involved in marriage within the Rabbinate is the Tzohar network.

Since the Rabbinate is affiliated with Orthodoxy, no Reform or Conservative rabbi may legally officiate at a wedding in Israel. Conservative rabbi Dov Haiyun was detained in July 2018 for performing an unsanctioned wedding, leading to protests and condemnation from opposition lawmakers and mainstream Jewish organizations in the United States.

Semikhah 

The Chief Rabbinate confers the semikhah (i.e., Rabbinic ordination) once the candidate has passed a series of six written tests on specified subjects 
 (mandatory are Shabbat, Kashrut, and Family purity).
The title conferred is the standard Yoreh Yoreh, with certificants also referred to as "Rav Shechuna" ("Rabbi of the Neighborhood"). 
Additional semachot — with similar testing requirements — are granted for:
"Rav Moshav" ("Rabbi of the settlement"); six exams, compulsory topics as above
"Rav Ezori" ("Rabbi of the Area"); 9 exams
"Rav Ir" ("[Chief] Rabbi of the City"); 11 exams - in other relevant areas of Orach Chayim, Yoreh De'ah and Even Ha'ezer - followed by an oral examination
Dayan - monetary law, as dealt with in Choshen Mishpat.

Rav Ir  and Dayanut are advanced qualications, and are offered only post Yoreh Yoreh.

The ordination by the Chief Rabbinate is not a monopoly in Israel, with many other rabbis and organizations having programs, such as that of the late Rabbi Zalman Nechemia Goldberg. However in order to be employed as a rabbi by the state, only semikhah from the Chief Rabbinate is accepted.

Criticism 
With the Rabbinate existing as a government department, there have been calls for the entire department to be shut down, and for a return to a localised model of rabbinate. These calls have increased in recent times because of two former Chief Rabbis being convicted of fraud, and the increasing encroachment of the religious institutions on the lives of Israelis. There are also charges that the office has become a political, rather than a religious, office, and that it has become beholden to the Haredi world and become their "puppets".

Their control of marriages and the negative experiences that some have had with them has caused a call for civil marriage in Israel.

At the same time, many defend the Chief Rabbinate as protecting the Jewish nature of Israel, the Torah, and even Diaspora Jewry.

References

External links
 Chief Rabbinate of Israel Official Website
 

 
Jews and Judaism in Israel
Rabbinical organizations